Moolakkarai is a village in Thoothukudi district, Tamil Nadu, India.
Hindu people are the majority in the village, and there are several Hindu temples.

References

Villages in Thoothukudi district